Group 4 of the UEFA Euro 1968 qualifying tournament was one of the eight groups to decide which teams would qualify for the UEFA Euro 1968 finals tournament. Group 4 consisted of three teams: Yugoslavia, West Germany, and Albania, where they played against each other home-and-away in a round-robin format. The group winners were Yugoslavia, who finished 1 point above West Germany.

Final table

Matches

Goalscorers

References
 
 
 

Group 1
1966–67 in Yugoslav football
1967–68 in Yugoslav football
1966–67 in German football
1967–68 in German football
1966–67 in Albanian football
1967–68 in Albanian football
Yugoslavia at UEFA Euro 1968